Princess Elizabeth Land is the sector of Antarctica between longitude 73° east and Cape Penck (at 87°43' east). The sector is claimed by Australia as part of the Australian Antarctic Territory, although this claim is not widely recognized.

Geography
Princess Elizabeth Land is located between 64°56'S and 90°00'S and between 73°35' E and 87°43'E. It is divided into two sectors:

 Ingrid Christensen Coast, 73°35'E to 81°24'E
 Leopold and Astrid Coast, 81°24'E to 87°43'E

It is bounded on the west by Amery Ice Shelf, Mac. Robertson Land, and on the east by Kaiser Wilhelm II Land.

Exploration
Princess Elizabeth Land was discovered on 9 February 1931, by the British Australian and New Zealand Antarctic Research Expedition (BANZARE) (1929–31) under Sir Douglas Mawson. Princess Elizabeth Land was named by Mawson after Princess Elizabeth, granddaughter of King George V who reigned at the time as King of Australia, among his other titles. Princess Elizabeth would later go on to become Queen Elizabeth II in 1952. This is one of two regions of Antarctica to be named for her. The other is Queen Elizabeth Land located across the continent in the British Antarctic Territory and named in 2012 in honour of the Queen's Diamond Jubilee.

Although Australia claims the entirety of Princess Elizabeth Land, it is home to Russian stations including Vostok Station (the coldest place on Earth) and Mirny Station which supplies it.

See also
 List of mountains of Princess Elizabeth Land
 Queen Elizabeth Land
 Queen Elizabeth Islands

External links

 Australian Antarctic Gazetteer: Maps of the Australian Antarctic Territory
 USGS.gov: ANTARCTICA.TXT — listing of most Antarctica features in one USGS file (note: Princess Elizabeth Land not listed).

 
Australian Antarctic Territory
Regions of Antarctica
Lands of Antarctica